{{DISPLAYTITLE:P2Y12}}

P2Y12  is a chemoreceptor for adenosine diphosphate (ADP) that belongs to the Gi class of a group of G protein-coupled (GPCR) purinergic receptors. This P2Y receptor family has several receptor subtypes with different pharmacological selectivity, which overlaps in some cases, for various adenosine and uridine nucleotides. The P2Y12 receptor is involved in platelet aggregation and is thus a biological target for the treatment of thromboembolisms and other clotting disorders. Two transcript variants encoding the same isoform have been identified for this gene.

In the field of purinergic signaling, the P2Y12 protein on the periphery is found mainly but not exclusively on the surface of blood platelets, and is an important regulator in blood clotting. In the central nervous system, this receptor has been found expressed exclusively on microglia, where it is necessary for physiological and pathological microglial actions, such as monitoring neuronal functions and microglial neuroprotection.

P2Y12 inhibitors 

The drugs clopidogrel (Plavix), prasugrel (Efient, Effient), ticagrelor (Brilinta), and cangrelor (Kengreal) bind to this receptor and are marketed as antiplatelet agents.

For acute coronary syndrome 
The combination of a P2Y12 inhibitor and aspirin, called dual antiplatelet treatment, remains the first-line treatment for acute coronary syndrome. A 2019 randomized trial suggested that prasugrel is superior to ticagrelor.

Antiplatelet treatment of STEMI 
In patients undergoing primary percutaneous coronary intervention (PCI) for an ST-segment elevation myocardial infarction (STEMI), US, European, and Canadian guidelines recommend that a P2Y12 inhibitor should be administered as soon as possible, although it is unclear whether administration of these medications before the patient arrives at the hospital confers additional benefits compared with in-hospital administration.

On the other hand, P2Y12 inhibitors do not change the risk of death when given as a pretreatment prior to routine PCI in people who have had a non-ST-elevation myocardial infarction (NSTEMI). Though, a P2Y12 inhibitor in addition to aspirin should be administered for up to 12 months to most patients with non-ST-elevation acute coronary syndrome. They do however increase the risk of bleeding and decrease the risk of further cardiovascular problems. Thus their routine use in this context is of questionable value.

A network meta-analysis of 37 studies involving 88,402 STEMI patients and 5,077 major adverse cardiac events (MACE) patients found that use of prasugrel was associated with lower mortality and MACE than other drugs in this class (clopidogrel and ticagrelor).

References

External links 
 
 
 

G protein-coupled receptors